Yujiulü Dengshuzi (pinyin: Yùjiǔlǘ Dèngshūzǐ) (?–555) was the last western khagan of the Rouran. He was a cousin of Anagui.

Reign 
He was enthroned in March 553 by remnants of Rouran and support of Western Wei in Woye (modern northern part of Ulansuhai Nur, Urad, Inner Mongolia). In 555, the Tujue invaded and occupied the Rouran and Dengshuzi led 3000 soldiers in retreat to Western Wei. He was later delivered to Turks by Emperor Gong with his soldiers under pressure from Muqan Qaghan.

References 

 

Khagans of the Rouran

555 deaths